The 2016–17 Handbollsligan is the 83rd season of the Handbollsligan, Swedish's top-tier handball league. A total of fourteen teams contest this season's league, which began on 13 September 2016 and is scheduled to conclude on 27 May 2017.

IFK Kristianstad are the defending champions, having beaten Alingsås HK 27–18 in the previous season's  final.

Format
The first 7 rounds consist on a round-robin tournament with 2 groups of 7 teams each. Then, the competition format for the 2016–17 season consists of a home-and-away round-robin system. The top 8 teams qualifiy directly to quarterfinals, while teams ranked 11th to 13th play a play-down round against teams ranked 2nd to 4th from the lower division. Last ranked team is directly relegated to Allsvenskan.

Teams

The following 14 clubs competed in Handbollsligan during the 2016–17 season. HK Drott was relegated from the previous season and IFK Ystad was promoted from 2015-16 Allsvenskan.

Regular season

Standings

Results 

Round 1-7

 Round 8-33

Play-offs

Season statistics

Top goalscorers

Player of the month

Attendance

References

External links
 Handbollsligan official website

Sweden
Swedish handball competitions
2016 in Swedish sport
2017 in Swedish sport